Smile Communications Uganda (SCU) was established in November 2009 and launched its 4G LTE operations in June 2013 in Kampala, the capital and largest city of Uganda. SCU is a subsidiary of Smile Telecoms Holdings, a Mauritius-based pan-African telecommunications group with operations in Nigeria, Uganda, Tanzania, the Democratic Republic of the Congo, and South Africa. SCU has since expanded its 4G LTE services, including the cities and towns of Fort Portal, Gulu, Jinja, Kabale, Masaka, Masindi, Mbale, Mbarara, Mukono, Soroti, Tororo, and Wakiso. SCU's voice-over-LTE, called "VoLTE", is compatible with the iPhone and Android systems. It enables Smile customers to call around the world, fixed or mobile, using the SmileVoice App.

See also
 List of mobile network operators in Uganda

References

External links
Official Smile Communications website

Mobile phone companies of Uganda
Telecommunications companies of Uganda
Telecommunications companies established in 2009
2009 establishments in Uganda